The Men's omnium event of the 2015 UCI Track Cycling World Championships was held on 20–21 February 2015.

Results

Scratch race
The scratch race was held at 14:40.

Individual pursuit
The individual pursuit was held at 17:00.

Elimination race
The elimination race was started at 22:15.

1 km time trial
The individual pursuit was held at 14:45.

Flying lap
The flying lap was started at 16:40.

Points race
The points race was started at 19:55.

Final standings
After all events.

References

Men's omnium
UCI Track Cycling World Championships – Men's omnium